GMTA may refer to:
Cherif Al Idrissi Airport (International Civil Aviation Organization airport code)
Green Mountain Transit Authority
The phrase "Great minds think alike."